Cryphioides is a monotypic moth genus of the family Noctuidae. Its only species, Cryphioides ocellata, is found in Madagascar. Both the genus and species was first described by Emilio Berio in 1964.

References

Acontiinae
Monotypic moth genera